Marjorie L. Harth is an American art historian whose research interests include 19th-century French art and museum studies. She is an emeritus art history professor at Pomona College in Claremont, California, and was the director of the Pomona College Museum of Art from 1981 to 2004.

Early life
Harth attended Smith College before earning a doctorate at the University of Michigan.

Career
Harth was the director of the Pomona College Museum of Art at Pomona College from 1981 to 2004. During her tenure, the museum significantly expanded its operations, including renaming itself from a gallery to a museum in 2001. In 2003, her chair was endowed and named the Herbert S. Rempel Directorship.

References

Year of birth missing (living people)
Living people
Pomona College faculty
American art historians
American museologists
Women art historians
Historians of France
Smith College alumni
University of Michigan alumni